Walker & Eisen (1919−1941) was an architectural partnership of architects Albert R. Walker and Percy A. Eisen in Los Angeles, California.

Partners in addition to Walker and Eisen included: Clifford A. Balch, William Glenn Balch, and Burt William Johnson.

Walker & Eisen worked on many cinema−theater designs with Clifford A. Balch.

Selected projects

Some of their notable buildings include:

 Southern Counties Gas Company building (1923) in association with Clark Brothers, Santa Ana, California.
 Taft Building, Hollywood (1923)
 National City Bank of Los Angeles Building (1924), 810 S. Spring St., Los Angeles
 Hotel Normandie, Koreatown, Los Angeles (1925)
 Fine Arts Building, Downtown Los Angeles (1927)
 United Artists Theatre, Downtown Los Angeles, in association with Detroit-based architect C. Howard Crane (1927)
 James Oviatt Building, Downtown Los Angeles (1927−1928)
 El Cortez Hotel, San Diego (1926)
 Beverly-Wilshire Hotel, Beverly Hills (1926−1928)
 The Platt Building, Downtown Los Angeles (1927)
 El Mirador Hotel, Palm Springs (1927−1928), remodeled by Paul R. Williams (1952)
 Valley National Bank Building, Tucson, Arizona (1929)
 Ambassador Hotel; Art Deco entrance pylons (1930)
 Clock Tower Building, Santa Monica (1929-1930)
 F. & W. Grand Silver Store Building (later Hartfield's department store), 537 S. Broadway, Los Angeles; Art Deco (1931)
 United Artists Pasadena Theatre, Old Town Pasadena, California (1931−1932)
 United Artists Theatre, Berkeley, aka United Artists Berkeley 7; Shattuck Avenue, Berkeley, California; Art Deco (1931−1932)
 United Artists Theatre, El Centro, California; Art Deco (1931−1932)
 Sunkist Building, Downtown Los Angeles (1935)
 Farmer's Insurance Company Headquarters Building; Moderne (1937), Architects Claud Beelman & Herman Spackler added 4 floors in 1949.

A number of their buildings are designated as Los Angeles Historic-Cultural Monuments. They are mentioned in the film (500) Days of Summer.

National City Bank of Los Angeles building
Built in 1924, the 12-story Beaux-Arts building at 810 South Spring Street was the headquarters of National City Bank of Los Angeles. With the important banks and financial institutions being concentrated there, the Spring Street Financial District was the financial center of Los Angeles in the first half of the 20th century, known as Wall Street of the West. The building was designated a Historic Cultural Landmark (HCM #871) in 2007.

The building was converted from offices to 93 residential units in 2008, and was renamed the National City Tower. The building also has retail space.

References

External links
  Los Angeles Conservancy.org: Walker & Eisen architecture firm (1919−1941) — firm's notable buildings with info + images.
     PCAD.edu: Walker and Eisen, Architects — list of firm's buildings and other works, links.

Defunct architecture firms based in California
Architects from Los Angeles
Defunct companies based in Greater Los Angeles
1919 establishments in California
1941 disestablishments in California
Design companies established in 1919
Design companies disestablished in 1941
20th century in Los Angeles
Historicist architects
Theatre architects
20th-century American architects